Jenkins School is a boys school in the Indian state of West Bengal. It was established in 1861 in the town of Cooch Behar.

History

After the independence of India in 1947, the princely state of Cooch Behar was merged with India in 1950 as Cooch Behar district within West Bengal, and Jenkins School was declared as one of the state government schools. During that period many teachers joined the school under the patronage of the then king of Cooch Behar, Maharaja Jagaddipendra Narayan and the government of West Bengal. Between the late 1940s and the early 1960s, the school flourished under the leadership of headmaster Kalipada Mukherjee. The Maharaja also employed Sailen Datta, a veteran cricketer of the Bengal cricket team for the upliftment of sports education in the school.

The National Award for Teachers was given to Prabodh Chandra Goswami, a  popular mathematics teacher in Jenkins School in 1958, the first year that the award was instituted.

The 100-year anniversary of Jenkins School was celebrated in January 1961. January 2011 saw the celebration of 150 years of the institution.

The first line of the school anthem is "."

Notable alumni
Charu Chandra Dutt, revolutionary, writer
Rai Choudhury Sushil Kumar Chakravarty, Fourth Minister, Cooch Behar State
Rai Saheeb Uma Nath Dutta, Civil and Sessions Judge, Revenue Officer (Dewan), Cooch Behar State
Dr. Bhabendra Narayan
Ambika Charan Roy, Law Practitioner, Social Reformer, Sitarist, Chairman Baharampur Municipality
Dr. Dinesha Nanda Chakravarty, Minister, Cooch Behar State Council
Prafulla Chandra Mustofi, musician
Nirmal Chandra Mustofi, Frist Class Magistrate, Cooch Behar State, philanthropist and erudite
Himadri Ballav Biswas, Civil and Sessions Judge, Cooch Behar State
Ashruman Das Gupta, Household Minister, Cooch Behar State, Writer
Rajendra Nath Sen, Player, Mohun Bagan Club
Shoilesh Chandra Mustofi, Orchid specialist and Horticulturist
Rai Saheeb Lalit Mohan Bakshi, Revenue Secretary and Development Commissioner, Cooch Behar State, Deputy Collector, Cooch Behar District 
Col. Nitya Nanda Chakravarty, I.M.S.
Bireshwar Bakshi, Civil and Sessions Judge
Suresh Chandra Singha, F.R.C.S.
Tarapada Mukhopadhyay, Civil and Sessions Judge, Cooch Behar State
Kumar Surendra Narayan, Player, Mohun Bagan Club
Bhabani Prasanna Talukdar, Member, Legislative Assembly
Rai Saheeb Surendra Kanta Basu Majumder, State Pleader, Member, Legislative Council, Cooch Behar State
Tulsi Lahiri, Bengali actor, director and play writer
Abbasuddin Ahmed, singer
Subodh Kumar Chakraborty, Writer
Mustafa Kamal
Sarat Singha,Player, Mohun Bagan Club
Dr. Amiya Bhushan Guha, Chairman, Cooch Behar Municipality
Arun Das Gupta, Player, Mohun Bagan Club

See also
Education in India
List of schools in India
Education in West Bengal

References

External links 
 Jenkins School
 Jenkins School in LinkedIn
 Jenkins school on Facebook
 Jenkins School Group in Facebook
 The Jenkins School Alumni Association on Facebook
 Pictures of the school

Boys' schools in India
High schools and secondary schools in West Bengal
Schools in Cooch Behar district
Educational institutions established in 1861
1861 establishments in British India